Aglossosia fusca is a moth of the subfamily Arctiinae. It is found in Eritrea.

References

Endemic fauna of Eritrea
Moths described in 1939
Lithosiini
Moths of Africa